Predrag Milinković (20 August 1933 – 4 April 1998) was a Serbian actor. He was the most famous side-kick actror in ex- Yugoslav movies. He appeared in 222 films from 1958 to 1998.

Selected filmography

References

External links

1933 births
1998 deaths
Male actors from Belgrade
Serbian male film actors